Vinson Chiu (born 8 August 1998) is an American badminton player. He won a silver medal with his partner Joshua Yuan in the men's doubles at the 2022 Pan Am Championships. Chiu also won a silver and a bronze at the 2016 Pan Am Junior Championships in the boys' doubles and mixed doubles. Chiu currently plays mixed doubles with Jennie Gai. They won their first title together at the Mexican International Challenge in 2021.

Chiu also once partnered with Indonesian legend Tony Gunawan and they went onto win the U.S. International in 2017.

Achievements

Pan Am Championships 
Men's doubles

Pan Am Junior Championships 
Boys' doubles

Mixed doubles

BWF International Challenge/Series (7 titles, 5 runners-up) 
Men's doubles

Mixed doubles

  BWF International Challenge tournament
  BWF International Series tournament
  BWF Future Series tournament

References

External links 
 
 

1998 births
Living people
American sportspeople of Chinese descent
Sportspeople from California
American male badminton players